He or HE may refer to:

Language
 He (letter), the fifth letter of the Semitic abjads
 He (pronoun), a pronoun in Modern English
 He (kana), one of the Japanese kana (へ in hiragana and ヘ in katakana)
 Ge (Cyrillic), a Cyrillic letter called He in Ukrainian
 Hebrew language (ISO 639-1 language code: he)

Places
 He County, Anhui, China
 He River, or Hejiang (贺江), a tributary of the Xi River in Guangxi and Guangdong
 Hebei, abbreviated as HE,  a province of China (Guobiao abbreviation HE)
 Hesse, abbreviated as HE, a state of Germany

People
 He (surname), Chinese surname, sometimes transcribed Hé or Ho; includes a list of notable individuals so named
 Zheng He (1371–1433), Chinese admiral  
 He (和) and He (合), collectively known as 和合二仙 (He-He er xian, "Two immortals He"), two Taoist immortals known as the "Immortals of Harmony and Unity"
 Immortal Woman He, or He Xiangu, one of the Eight Immortals of Taoism

Arts, entertainment, and media
 "He" (short story), a 1926 short story by H. P. Lovecraft
 "He", a 1927 short story by Katherine Anne Porter
 He (film), a 2012 Irish film
 "He" (song), a 1955 Christian song written by Jack Richards and Richard Mullan
 "He", a song by Jars of Clay from the 1995 album Jars of Clay (album)
 He, a novel by John Connolly about Stan Laurel

Acronyms
 His Eminence, a religious title
 His or Her Excellency, a political title

Science
Hektoen enteric agar, used in microbiology to identify certain organisms
Helium, symbol He, a chemical element
Hemagglutinin esterase, a viral protein
Hematoxylin and eosin stain, a popular staining method in histology
Hepatic encephalopathy
High explosive
Holocene Era or Human Era, the year count system of the Holocene calendar
Holocene Epoch, its rough equivalent
Homomorphic encryption

Military
High-explosive anti-tank, or HEAT
High-explosive incendiary, or HEI
High-explosive incendiary/armor-piercing ammunition, or HEIAP

Other uses
 Heathrow Express, an airport rail link between London Heathrow Airport and Paddington
 Heinkel Flugzeugwerke (in aircraft model prefixes)
 Higher education
 Hurricane Electric, a global Internet service provider

See also
 Hezhou (disambiguation)